Popular election or popular vote may refer to:

 Any election in a democracy
 An election taking place under universal suffrage
 Direct election, an election in which people vote directly for the candidate that they want
 Popular vote, in an indirect election, is the total number of votes received in the first-phase election, as opposed to the votes cast by those elected to take part in the final election
 In United States presidential elections it connotes the total number or percentage of votes cast for a candidate by voters in the 50 states and Washington, D.C., as distinguished from the electoral college vote which decides the outcome. See also the National Popular Vote Interstate Compact
 Referendum, or plebiscite, a direct vote in which an entire electorate is asked to vote on a particular proposal
 Straw poll, an ad hoc or unofficial vote
 Popularity contest, pejorative